Yersiniops solitarius is a species of praying mantis native to the United States.

See also
List of mantis genera and species

References

Mantidae
Mantodea of North America
Insects of the United States
Insects described in 1896